List of wear Orders, decorations, and medals of the Kingdom of Hungary in 1944.

Sources

See also
Orders, decorations, and medals of Hungary

References